Tantalum(V) bromide is the inorganic compound with the formula Ta2Br10. Its name comes from the compound's empirical formula, TaBr5.  It is a diamagnetic, orange solid that hydrolyses readily.  The compound adopts an edge-shared bioctahedral structure, which means that two TaBr5 units are joined by a pair of bromide bridges. There is no bond between the Ta centres. Niobium(V) chloride, niobium(V) bromide, niobium(V) iodide, tantalum(V) chloride, and tantalum(V) iodide all share this structural motif.

Preparation and handling
The material is usually prepared by the reaction of bromine with tantalum metal (or tantalum carbide) at elevated temperatures in a tube furnace. The bromides of the early metals are sometimes preferred to the chlorides because of the relative ease of handling liquid bromine vs gaseous chlorine. Like other molecular halides, it is soluble in nonpolar solvents such as carbon tetrachloride (1.465 g/100 mL at 30 °C), but it reacts with some solvents.

It can also be produced from the more accessible oxide by metathesis using aluminium tribromide:
Ta2O5  + 3.3 AlBr3  →  2 TaBr5  +  3.3 Al2O3 
Carbothermal reduction of the oxide in the presence of bromine has also been employed, the byproduct being COBr2.

References

Bromides
Tantalum compounds
Metal halides